Mitrella scripta, the music dove shell, is a species of sea snail in the family Columbellidae, the dove snails.

Description
The surface of the shell usually is white with a patching of pale brown on the whorls.

Distribution
This species occurs in European waters (Spain, Portugal, Madeira), the Mediterranean Sea and in the Indian Ocean off Tanzania.

References

 Spry, J.F. (1961). The sea shells of Dar es Salaam: Gastropods
 Gofas, S.; Le Renard, J.; Bouchet, P. (2001). Mollusca, in: Costello, M.J. et al. (Ed.) (2001). European register of marine species: a check-list of the marine species in Europe and a bibliography of guides to their identification. Collection Patrimoines Naturels, 50: pp. 180–213

External links
 
 Sociedad Española de Malacologia
 M. deMaintenon  The Columbellidae (Gastropoda: Neogastropoda) collected at Ambon during the Rumphius Biohistorical Expedition
 

scripta
Gastropods described in 1758
Taxa named by Carl Linnaeus